Andrea Stoppini was the defending champion, but decided not to participate.Somdev Devvarman defeated Marsel İlhan 6–4, 6–3 to win the title.

Seeds

Draw

Finals

Top half

Bottom half

References
Main Draw
Qualifying Singles

Singles